John Vernon (c. 1618 – 13 March 1670) was Quartermaster-General of Oliver Cromwell’s army and third son of Sir Edward Vernon, of Houndshill, Staffordshire, England. John obtained title to Clontarf Castle near Dublin in 1649 through a financial arrangement with John Blackwall who had been granted the estate by Oliver Cromwell. Thereafter the Vernons occupied the castle for approximately 300 years.

See also

Vernon family
Vernon (surname)
Clontarf, Dublin
Clontarf Castle

Sources
'Vernon of Clontarf Castle' in Burke's Landed Gentry of Ireland (1912) pp. 722–3
 Burke's Colonial Gentry (1891), available on Internet Archives: https://archive.org/details/genealogical01burk
 A Study of Vernon and Venables Families and Their Connections

1610s births
1670 deaths
Clontarf, Dublin
People from County Dublin